John Robinson (2 February 1909 – 28 September 1988) was an English cricketer. He played one match for Gloucestershire in 1929.

References

External links

1909 births
1988 deaths
English cricketers
Gloucestershire cricketers
Cricketers from Bristol